Lloyd Bertram Marsh (July 31, 1893  – August 1971) was an American Republican Party politician who served as Secretary of State of New Jersey and Chairman of the New Jersey Republican State Committee.

Biography
Marsh was born in Little Falls, New Jersey in 1893 to James and Emma (Coon) Marsh. After attending Clifton High School, Marsh first worked as an office boy for the Passaic County Clerk. He eventually achieved the position of County Clerk in 1929. He became chairman of the Passaic County Republican Committee in 1937.

In 1943 Marsh managed the campaign of Walter Evans Edge for Governor of New Jersey. When Edge received his party's nomination, Marsh was elected Chairman of the New Jersey Republican State Committee.  Edge also appointed Marsh Secretary of State of New Jersey in 1946, a position he continued to serve under Edge's successor, Alfred E. Driscoll, until the end of his term in 1954.

He died in August 1971.

Legacy
Three years after Marsh's death in 1971, he was named as an unindicted co-conspirator in a grand jury indictment of J. Edward Crabiel, then serving as Governor Brendan Byrne's Secretary of State. The indictment charged that Marsh and others had received bribes from paving companies in return for  awarding contracts in Paterson and the surrounding Passaic County area.

References

External links
Biographical information for Lloyd B. Marsh from The Political Graveyard

1893 births
1971 deaths
Chairmen of the New Jersey Republican State Committee
Clifton High School (New Jersey) alumni
Politicians from Clifton, New Jersey
People from Little Falls, New Jersey
Secretaries of State of New Jersey
New Jersey Republicans
20th-century American politicians